The Monégasque film industry produced three feature films in 2014, all minor-release documentaries. This article fully lists all non-pornographic films, including short films, that had a release date in that year and which were at least partly made by Monaco. It does not include films first released in previous years that had release dates in 2014.  Also included is an overview of the major events in Monégasque film, including film festivals and awards ceremonies, as well as lists of those films that have been particularly well received, both critically and financially.

Minor Releases

See also

 2014 in film
 2014 in Monaco

References

External links

Monaco
Films
2014
Monaco
2010s French-language films
Films,2014